Frank Bamenye Bizoza (born 23 October 2001) is a footballer who plays as a midfielder for Mjøndalen IF.

Born in Tanzania to Burundian parents, Bamenye migrated to Norway at the age of 2. Hailing from Drammen club Skiold, he went to Mjøndalen as a junior and made his senior debut in August 2019 against Kristiansund.

References

1997 births
Living people
People from Kigoma Region
Tanzanian people of Burundian descent
Tanzanian emigrants to Norway
Naturalised citizens of Norway
Sportspeople from Drammen
Norwegian footballers
Association football midfielders
Mjøndalen IF players
Eliteserien players
Norwegian people of Burundian descent